William F. Grebe (March 9, 1869 – June 29, 1960) was an American fencer who competed in the 1904 Summer Olympics. In 1904 he won the silver medal in  individual sabre competition and a bronze medal in singlestick competition. He also competed in the individual foil event but was eliminated in the first round. In 1906 he won the U.S. national championship in dueling sword (now known as épée).  He is also known to have competed in the 1910 and 1912 U.S. national championships but was eliminated in the preliminary rounds both times.

Grebe's 1904 Silver would be the only U.S. Olympic medal in men's saber until Peter Westbrook won a bronze medal in 1984 and Daryl Homer won a silver medal in 2016.  The U.S. has never won gold in men's saber.

References

External links
 William Grebe's profile at databaseOlympics

1869 births
1960 deaths
American male épée fencers
Fencers at the 1904 Summer Olympics
Olympic silver medalists for the United States in fencing
Olympic bronze medalists for the United States in fencing
Medalists at the 1904 Summer Olympics
American male foil fencers
American male sabre fencers
19th-century American people
20th-century American people